Cuba competed in the 2008 Summer Olympics in Beijing, People's Republic of China. As of 8 August 2008, 165 Cuban athletes had qualified to compete in 16 sports. The country's flagbearer at the opening ceremony was wrestler Mijaín López.

Medalists

Archery

Cuba sent archers to the Olympics for the third time, seeking the nation's first Olympic medal in the sport. Juan Carlos Stevens earned the country its only qualifying spot, in the men's competition, by placing second in the 2008 Pan American championship.

Athletics

Cuba sent 40 representatives in athletics.

Men
Track & road events

Field events

Combined events – Decathlon

Women
Track & road events

Field events

Combined events – Heptathlon

* The athlete who finished in second place, Lyudmila Blonska of the Ukraine, tested positive for a banned substance. Both the A and the B tests were positive, therefore Blonska was stripped of her silver medal, and Quintana moved up a position.

Baseball

Cuba earned a qualification spot in baseball by placing in the top two at the 2006 Americas Olympic Qualifying Event.

Boxing

Cuba qualified ten boxers for the Olympic boxing tournament. The light heavyweight class was the only one in which Cuba did not qualify a boxer. Nine of the ten Cuban qualifiers did so at the first American qualifying tournament. For the first time since the 1988 Olympic Games, Cuba did not win a gold medal.

Canoeing

Sprint
Three Cuban canoers and one kayaker have qualified for the Olympic Games.

Qualification Legend: QS = Qualify to semi-final; QF = Qualify directly to final

Cycling

Road

Track
Sprint

Omnium

Diving

Men

Fencing

Women

Judo

Men

Women

Modern pentathlon

Rowing 

Men

Women

Qualification Legend: FA=Final A (medal); FB=Final B (non-medal); FC=Final C (non-medal); FD=Final D (non-medal); FE=Final E (non-medal); FF=Final F (non-medal); SA/B=Semifinals A/B; SC/D=Semifinals C/D; SE/F=Semifinals E/F; QF=Quarterfinals; R=Repechage

Shooting

Men

Women

Swimming

Men

Women

Taekwondo

1 Ángel Matos was leading 3–2 in the bronze medal bout against Kazakhstan's Arman Chilmanov, until he apparently suffered a broken toe, and was subsequently ruled to have retired after the allotted one minute of injury time expired. Matos kicked referee Chakir Chelbat in the face, pushed a judge and spat on the floor of the arena before he and his coach, Leudin González, who criticized the referee's ruling as too strict and accused Kazakhstan of bribing officials, were escorted put by security. The World Taekwondo Federation (WTF) banned Matos and González for life, and Matos' results at the Beijing Games were deleted from the records.

Volleyball

Beach

Indoor

Women's tournament

Cuba qualified a team to the women's tournament. The team won all of its five group play games, finishing as group winners. They also won the quarterfinal, bot lost both the semifinal and the bronze medal game, thus obtaining a final ranking of 4th for the tournament.

Roster

Group play

Quarterfinal

Semifinal

Bronze medal game

Weightlifting

Men

Wrestling

Men's freestyle

 Michel Batista originally finished fifth, but in November 2016, he was promoted to bronze due to disqualification of Taimuraz Tigiyev.

Men's Greco-Roman

See also
 Cuba at the 2007 Pan American Games
 Cuba at the 2008 Summer Paralympics

References

Nations at the 2008 Summer Olympics
2008
Summer Olympics